The Journal of Knowledge Management is a peer-reviewed academic journal covering knowledge management. According to the Journal Citation Reports, the journal has a 2021 impact factor of 8.689.

See also
Electronic Journal of Knowledge Management
Journal of Knowledge Management Practice

References

External links
 

Knowledge management journals
English-language journals
Publications established in 1997
Emerald Group Publishing academic journals